HNLMS De Ruyter (F806) was a frigate of the . The ship was in service with the Royal Netherlands Navy from 1976 to 2001. The frigate was named after Dutch naval hero Michiel de Ruyter. The ship's radio call sign was "PAEP".

Service history
HNLMS De Ruyter was one of two s and was built at the KM de Schelde in Vlissingen. The keel laying took place on 22 December 1971 and the launching on 9 March 1974. The ship was put into service on 3 June 1976.

The ships returned on 19 June.

During the mid-90s the ship was part off Standing Naval Forces Mediterranean (STANAVFORMED) and helped to enforce an embargo for the coast of Yugoslavia.

On 3 October 2001 the vessel was decommissioned and later scrapped. The bridge with radar dome of De Ruyter   are preserved at the Dutch Navy Museum in Den Helder.

Notes

Tromp-class frigates
1974 ships
Ships built in Vlissingen
Frigates of the Cold War